Jeremiah Seed (1700–1747) was an English clergyman and academic.

Life
His father was Jeremiah Seed, who graduated B.A. from Jesus College, Cambridge, in 1682, and was rector of Clifton, Westmoreland, from 1707 until his death in 1722. Jeremiah Seed the younger was educated at Lowther grammar school, and matriculated on 7 November 1716 at The Queen's College, Oxford, proceeding B.A. on 13 February 1722, and M.A. 1725. He was chosen a fellow in 1732, and was for some years curate to Daniel Waterland, vicar of Twickenham, whose funeral sermon he preached on 4 January 1741. Seed was presented by his college in the same year to the rectory of Knight's Enham, Hampshire, where he remained until his death on 10 December 1747.

Works
Seed was admired as a preacher. Samuel Johnson remarked that "he was not very theological" but had "a very fine style." Two sermons were published during his lifetime; others posthumously as Discourses (London, 1743; 6th, 1766). The Posthumous Works, consisting of sermons, essays, and letters, was edited by Joseph Hall, M.A., fellow of Queen's College,  and was printed for M. Seed (possibly his widow), 1750, London, 2 vols. Other editions appeared, 2 vols., Dublin, 1750; London, 1770, 1 vol.; and the work is said to have been translated into Russian.

References

Notes

Attribution

1700 births
1747 deaths
18th-century English Anglican priests
Fellows of The Queen's College, Oxford
People from Clifton, Cumbria